Dream Girl is the second studio album by Norwegian singer Anna of the North, released on 25 October 2019 by Honeymoon Records. The project follows her 2017 album, Lovers, as well as features on Tyler, the Creator's singles, "Boredom", and "911 / Mr. Lonely".

Track listing

References

2019 albums
Anna of the North albums